Gerada is a surname. Notable people with the surname include:

Clare Gerada (born 1959), British-Maltese physician
Emanuele Gerada (1920–2011), Maltese Roman Catholic prelate
Mariano Gerada (1766–1823), Maltese sculptor
Simon Gerada (born 1981), Australian-Maltese table tennis player